Congressman Jones may refer to:

 Benjamin Jones (congressman)
 James R. Jones
 Mondaire Jones
 Walter B. Jones Jr.
 Walter B. Jones Sr.

Title and name disambiguation pages